The Bay of Langarano is a bay in the south-western coast of Madagascar.

Geography
The bay is in the region of Atsimo-Andrefana. It lies in the Mozambique Channel area, between the mouths of the Linta River and the Menarandra River. Port d'Androka is a harbour located 4 km to the southeast.

See also
 Geography of Madagascar

References

External links

Langarano
Atsimo-Andrefana